Roaring Spring Historic District is a national historic district located at Roaring Spring, Blair County, Pennsylvania.  The district includes 573 contributing buildings, 3 contributing sites, and 2 contributing structures in the central business district and surrounding residential areas of Roaring Spring.  The earliest buildings date to the 1860s, when the community was founded as the region's first paper mill town. The buildings are primarily frame and brick, with notable examples of Colonial Revival and Queen Anne style architecture. Notable non-residential buildings include the Odd Fellows Hall (1882), Hite's Furniture Store (c. 1888), Roaring Spring Bank (1902), old Borough Building and Fire Station (1906), Zook Building (c. 1885), Bare Memorial Church of God (1889-1930), Trinity United Methodist Church (1898), Blank Book Company buildings, and Roaring Spring Passenger Station (c. 1905).  Also located in the district are the Bare Memorial Fountain (1937) and Greenlawn Cemetery and Memorial Park.

It was added to the National Register of Historic Places in 1995.

References

Historic districts on the National Register of Historic Places in Pennsylvania
Historic districts in Blair County, Pennsylvania
National Register of Historic Places in Blair County, Pennsylvania